Makarand Madhukar Anaspure  (Marathi pronunciation: [məkəɾən̪d̪ ənaːspuɾe]; born 22 July 1969) is an Indian actor, director and producer. He has primarily appeared in Marathi films and theater.

Career
Anaspure came to fame after having worked in Saatchya Aat Gharat and Kaydyacha Bola. He credits Nana Patekar for his access into the film industry. Anaspure is known for his ability to use the Marathwada accent of the Marathi language.

Makarand has also acted in Bollywood films and Hindi TV serials like CID, Tu Tu Main Main and films like My Friend Ganesh 3, Jis desh mein Ganga rehta hain, and Yashwant.

Anaspure directed the Marathi film Dambis, in 2011. He has also produced films.

Naam Foundation
In September 2015, Nana Patekar and Makarand Anaspure established an organisation called Naam Foundation, which works to provide farmers aid to  overcome the drought conditions in rural Marathwada and Vidarbha in the state of Maharashtra, India.

Filmography

Marathi movies

De Dhakka 2 (2022)
Zelya (2018)
Dr. Tatya a Lahane (2018) 
Pani Bini (2018) 
Punha Gondhal Punha Mujra (2016)
Nagpur Adhiveshan (2016)
Rangaa Patangaa (2016)
Kapus Kondyachi Goshta (2016)
Shasan (2016)
Sata Lota Pan Sagla Khota (2015)
Wanted Bayko No.1 (2015)
Gunthamantri (2015) 
 Anvatt (2014)
Punha Gondhal Punha Mujra (2014)
Zapatalela-2 (3D) (2013)
Angarki (2013)
Dankyavar Danka (2013)
We are on - Houn jau dya(2013)
Gadya Aapla Gaon Bara (2013)
Beed Cha Raaja (2013)
Mala Ek Chanas Hava (2012)
Pipaani (2012) 
Baburao La Pakda  (2012)
Teen Bayka Fajiti Aika (2012)
Teecha Baap Tyacha Baap (2011)
Dambis (2011)
Don Ghadicha Dav (2011)
Guldasta (2011)
Davpech (2011)
Paradh  (2010)
Hapus (2010)
Tukya Tukvila Nagya Nachvila (2010)... Tukaram
Agadbam (2010)
Khurchi Samrat (2010)
Batti Gul Powerful (2010)... Kishoranand
Manya Sajjana (2010)    manohar dixit
Nishani Dava Angtha  as Dukare Guruji (2009)
Sumbaran (2009)
Sagla Karun Bhagle (2009)
Nau Mahine Nau Divas (2009)
Baap Re Baap Dokyala Taap (2009)
No Problem (2008)
Full Three Dhamal (2008)
Goshta Choti Dongraevadhi (2009)... Rajaram
Gallit Gondhal Dillit Mujra (2009)... Narayan Wagh
Mi Shivajiraje Bhosale Boltoy (2009)... Raiba
Sasu Numbari Jawai Dus Numbari (2008)... Tukaram
De Dhakka (2008)... Makarand Suryabhan Jadhav
Dum Dum Diga Diga (2008)... Gurunath
Uladhal (2008)
Full 3 Dhamaal (2008)
Oxygen (2008)
Doghat Tisara Ata Sagala Visara (2008)
Saade Maade Teen (2007)... Madan
Zabardast (2007)
Are Deva (2007)
Tula Shikwin Chaanglach Dhada (2007)
Jau Tithe Khau (2007)
Gadhvache Lagna (2007)... Savala
Bagh haat dakhvun (2006)
Nana Mama (2006)... Mama
Shubhamangal Savadhan (2006)
Khabardar (2006 film)
Kay Dyache Bola (2005)... Advocate Keshav Kunthalgirikar
Savarkhed: Ek Gaav (2004)... Ishya
Saatchya Aat Gharat (2004)
Sarkarnama (1997)

Hindi movies
 Yeshwant (1997)
 Wajood (1998)
 Vaastav: The Reality (1999)
 Jis Desh Mein Ganga Rehta Hain (2000)
 Pran Jaye Par Shaan Na Jaye (2003)
 My Friend Ganesha 3 (2010)
 Hello! Hum Lallan Bol Rahe Hain (2010) as Ganesh
Bhojpuri Film

• Pinjrewaali Muniya (2007)

List of Marathi TV serials
 Bedhund Manachya Lahari
 Tur Tur
 Oon Paus
 Tisra Dola
 Shejaar
 Aamchya Sarkhe Aamhich
 Comedychi Bullet Train
 Naammatra
 Post Office Ughade Aahe

Hindi TV serials
He appeared in a cameo for one episode in the Hindi serial Tu Tu Main Main and as an umpire along with co-stars Bharat Jadhav and Arun Kadam.

As a host
Makrand was host of the Marathi show Hapta Band in its second season on Zee Marathi. He judged the comedy show Fu Bai Fu. He was also the host of Marathi show Assal Pahune Irsal Namune on Colors Marathi.

As a writer
 Struggler (2005) (dialogue)

As a producer
Goshta Choti Dongraevadhi (2009)
Gallit Gondhal Dillit Mujara (2009)

As a director
Dambis (2011)
Kalokhachya Parambya (TBD)

As a second unit director or assistant director
Yeshwant (1997) (assistant director)

References

External links

Living people
1973 births
Male actors in Marathi cinema
Male actors from Maharashtra
Male actors in Hindi cinema
20th-century Indian male actors
21st-century Indian male actors
People from Beed
Male actors in Marathi television